The Mason's Arms is a pub on Battersea Park Road, Battersea, London SW8, situated opposite Battersea Park Railway Station.

It is a Grade II listed building, built in the mid-19th century. In October 2019 it reopened following a major refurbishment.

References

External links
 
 

Grade II listed pubs in London
Battersea
Grade II listed buildings in the London Borough of Wandsworth
Pubs in the London Borough of Wandsworth